Thomas Turner (died c. 1586), of Bath, Somerset, was an English politician.

He was a Member (MP) of the Parliament of England for Bath in 1563. He was Mayor of Bath in 1575–76.

References

Year of birth missing
1580s deaths
English MPs 1563–1567
Mayors of Bath, Somerset